The Northern Districts men's cricket team are one of six New Zealand first-class cricket teams that make up New Zealand Cricket.

They are based in the northern half of the North Island of New Zealand (excluding Auckland). They compete in the Plunket Shield first-class competition, the Ford Trophy domestic one-day competition and the Men's Super Smash T20 competition as the Northern Brave. The T20 team was previously known as the Northern Knights until the 2021–22 season, when both the men's and women's teams were rebranded under the same name.

Northern Districts, the last of the six current teams to attain first-class status, joined the Plunket Shield competition in 1956–57. The six district associations that make up Northern Districts are the Northland Cricket Association, Counties Manukau Cricket Association, Waikato Valley Cricket, Hamilton Cricket Association, Bay of Plenty Cricket and Poverty Bay Cricket Association.

Honours
 Plunket Shield (8)
1962–63, 1979–80, 1991–92, 1992–93, 1999–00, 2006–07, 2009–10, 2011–12.

 The Ford Trophy (7)
1979–80, 1994–95, 1997–98, 2002–03, 2004–05, 2008–09, 2009–10.

 Men's Super Smash (4)
2013–14, 2017–18, 2021-22, 2022-23

Grounds
Seddon Park, Hamilton (primary home ground)
Bay Oval, Blake Park Mount Maunganui
Cobham Oval, Whangarei
Harry Barker Reserve, Gisborne
Owen Delany Park, Taupo

Squad

Contracted players for the 2017/18 Season

 No. denotes the player's squad number, as worn on the back of their shirt.
  denotes players with international caps.

See also
 List of Northern Districts representative cricketers

Further reading
 Winston Hooper, Everest to Vettori: The ND Story, Northern Districts Cricket, Hamilton, 2006

References

External links
 
List of first-class matches played by Northern Districts
Northern Districts men's cricket team

1955 establishments in New Zealand
New Zealand first-class cricket teams

Cricket clubs established in 1955
Cricket in Northern Districts
Super Smash (cricket)